Silvino Robin (born 29 October 1923) was a Brazilian weightlifter. He competed in the men's light heavyweight event at the 1952 Summer Olympics.

References

External links
 

1923 births
Possibly living people
Brazilian male weightlifters
Olympic weightlifters of Brazil
Weightlifters at the 1952 Summer Olympics
Sportspeople from Rio de Janeiro (city)
20th-century Brazilian people